Cunomaglus ("Hound Lord") is the epithet of a Celtic god identified with Apollo.

A temple at Nettleton Shrub in Wiltshire was dedicated to Apollo Cunomaglus, existing shortly after 69 AD. In the 3rd Century BC it developed into a major cult centre: a large shrine, hall, hostel, shops, and priest's house were built, demonstrating the wealth and popularity of the cult.  Diana and  Silvanus were also worshipped there, suggesting that Cunomaglus may have been a god of hunting. It is also possible the shrine may have been a healing sanctuary, since Apollo's main role as a Celtic god was as a healer, the site is close to water, and finds such as tweezers and pins may denote the presence of a curative cult.

See also
 Romano-Celtic temple

References

Gods of the ancient Britons
Hunting gods
Health gods